Turkey competed at the 2016 European Athletics Championships in Amsterdam, Netherlands, between 6 and 10 July 2016.

Turkey participated at the championship with 55 athletes winning a total of twelve medals (four gold, five silver and three bronze). One of the bronze medals was awarded to the team in half marathon.

Medals by event

Results

Men

Track and road events

Field events

Women

Track and road events

Field events

References

European Athletics Championships
2016
Nations at the 2016 European Athletics Championships